Hilltop School or Hill Top School may refer to:

The school from Timothy Goes to School
A preschool housed in the former Bangor Children's Home building
Hill Top Preparatory School, in Radnor Township, Pennsylvania
Hilltop Country Day School, Sparta, New Jersey

See also
Hilltop Baptist School
Hilltop High School (disambiguation)